The Kominsky Method is an American comedy-drama streaming television series, created by Chuck Lorre, that premiered on November 16, 2018, on Netflix. It stars Michael Douglas, Alan Arkin, Sarah Baker, Nancy Travis, Paul Reiser, and Kathleen Turner and follows a fictional aging acting coach who many years earlier had a brief moment of success as an actor.

A second season premiered on October 25, 2019, and a third and final season, without Arkin, premiered on May 28, 2021.

Premise
The Kominsky Method follows Sandy Kominsky, a fictional actor who years ago had a brief fling with success and is now a revered Hollywood acting coach.

Cast and characters

Main
 Michael Douglas as Sandy Kominsky, a once successful actor who now works as a revered acting coach in Hollywood. 
 Alan Arkin as Norman Newlander, Sandy's agent and friend (seasons 1–2)
 Sarah Baker as Mindy Volander–Kominsky, Sandy's daughter who runs his acting studio with him. 
 Nancy Travis as Lisa, a recent divorcée who decides to take acting lessons from Sandy. (seasons 1–2)
 Paul Reiser as Martin Schneider, Mindy's boyfriend (season 3; recurring season 2)
 Kathleen Turner as Dr. Roz Volander, Sandy's ex-wife (season 3; guest season 2)

Recurring

Students in Kominsky's acting class 
 Melissa Tang as Margaret 
 Jenna Lyng Adams as Darshani
 Graham Rogers as Jude
 Casey Brown as Lane
 Ashleigh LaThrop as Breana
 Emily Osment as Theresa

Other 
 Susan Sullivan as Eileen, Norman's deceased wife, to whom he was married to for 46 years (seasons 1–2)
 Lisa Edelstein as Phoebe, Norman's estranged daughter who struggles with a pill addiction
 Ramon Hilario as Alex the Waiter
 Cedric Begley as Mathew, Lisa's son (season 1)
 Anoush NeVart as Rosamie, Norman's housekeeper (season 1)
 Ann-Margret as Diane, Norman's friend (season 1)
 Jane Seymour as Madelyn, a rekindled flame from Norman's past (seasons 2–3)
 Haley Joel Osment as Robby, Phoebe's son (seasons 2–3)

Guest

Episodes

Season 1 (2018)

Season 2 (2019)

Season 3 (2021)

Production

Development
On August 14, 2017, it was announced that Netflix was finalizing a series order for the production for a first season consisting of ten episodes. The series was set to be written by Chuck Lorre, Al Higgins, and David Javerbaum. Lorre was also set to direct the first episode and executive produce alongside Michael Douglas. Production companies involved with the series were slated to consist of Chuck Lorre Productions and Warner Bros. Television. On July 29, 2018, it was announced during the Television Critics Association's annual summer press tour that the series was to premiere on November 16, 2018. On January 17, 2019, it was announced that the series had been renewed for a second season consisting of eight episodes. The second season was released on October 25, 2019. On July 2, 2020, Netflix renewed the series for a third and final season, which was released on May 28, 2021.

Casting
Alongside the series order announcement, it was confirmed that Michael Douglas and Alan Arkin had been cast in the lead roles of Sandy Kominsky and Norman Newlander, respectively. In January 2018, it was announced that Nancy Travis and Sarah Baker had been cast in main roles and that Susan Sullivan, Emily Osment, Graham Rogers, Ashleigh LaThrop, Jenna Lyng Adams, Melissa Tang, Casey Brown, and Lisa Edelstein would appear in a recurring capacity.

On February 7, 2019, it was announced that Jane Seymour, Jacqueline Bisset and Paul Reiser had been cast in recurring roles for season two. Bisset was set to play Sandy's ex-wife, but the role was recast with Kathleen Turner, with whom Douglas had previously co-starred in the films Romancing the Stone (1984), The Jewel of the Nile (1985), and The War of the Roses (1989). On September 23, 2020, it was announced that Alan Arkin would not be returning for the show's final season, with Turner's character Dr. Roz Volander instead promoted to a lead role alongside Douglas as Sandy.

Reception

Critical response
The series received a positive critical response upon its premiere. On the review aggregation website Rotten Tomatoes, the first season holds an approval rating of 80% with an average score of 6.6/10. The website's critical consensus reads, "Full of humor and heart, The Kominsky Method paints a surprisingly poignant – if a little paint-by-numbers – portrait of life and aging, elevated by two top-notch performances by acting legends Alan Arkin and Michael Douglas." Metacritic, which uses a weighted average, assigned the first season a score of 68 out of 100 based on 19 critics, indicating "generally favorable reviews."

Awards and nominations

Home media
The first season was released to general retailers on November 19, 2019 in Region 1, with a Blu-ray version made available exclusively through the Warner Archive Collection.

See also 
 Stanislavski's system – a real system of training actors

References

External links
 
 
 

2018 American television series debuts
2021 American television series endings
2010s American comedy-drama television series
2020s American comedy-drama television series
English-language Netflix original programming
Television series about actors
Television series about cancer
Television series about old age
Television series by Warner Bros. Television Studios
Television series created by Chuck Lorre
Television shows set in Los Angeles
Best Musical or Comedy Series Golden Globe winners